The pyramid of Senusret I is an Egyptian pyramid built to be the burial place of the Pharaoh Senusret I. The pyramid was built during the Twelfth Dynasty of Egypt at el-Lisht, near the pyramid of his father, Amenemhat I. Its ancient name was Senusret Petei Tawi (Senusret beholds the two lands).

The pyramid was 105 meters on each side with a height of 61.25 meters; the slope of the four faces was 49° 24'. The pyramid used a method of construction never before seen in an Egyptian pyramid; four stone walls radiated from the center built of rough-hewn blocks that decreased in size the higher their placement. The eight sections formed by these walls were then subdivided by three more walls, splitting the pyramid into 32 different units which were then filled with slabs of stone as well as debris. An exoskeleton of fine limestone then covered the structure. This new method of construction was not particularly efficient, however, and the completed pyramid suffered from stability problems. Unusually, clear evidence for the ramps used to construct the pyramid also remain.

Complex 
Surrounding the actual structure was a comparatively large complex, which consisted of a mortuary temple, a rectangular structure with a courtyard in the center, and nine smaller pyramids for Senusret's queens. From the mortuary, a limestone causeway with carved statues set every 10 cubits ran to a public temple outside the perimeter wall of the compound. Little of this is visible today, however, because later Roman buildings were built over the complex.

Excavations 
The pyramid has been severely damaged over time, and little of its limestone cladding remains. It now appears as little more than a hillock of stone. 
None of the excavations penetrated to the burial chamber due to high water levels, but much was learned about pyramid construction from the surrounding quarries, which contained one of the highest concentrations of ancient debris of any Egyptian archaeological site.

Gautier and Jequier
The pyramid was first explored by archaeologists Gautier and Jequier between 1894 and 1895.

Metropolitan Museum of Art 

Dieter Arnold 
From 1984 to 1987, further excavation was carried out by Dieter Arnold.

See also 
Egyptian pyramid construction techniques
List of Egyptian pyramids
List of megalithic sites

References

Sources 
 
 

Buildings and structures completed in the 20th century BC
Senusret I
Lisht
Pyramids of the Twelfth Dynasty of Egypt
20th century BC in Egypt